In mathematics, coarse functions are functions that may appear to be continuous at a distance, but in reality are not necessarily continuous. Although continuous functions are usually observed on a small scale, coarse functions are usually observed on a large scale.

See also 
 Coarse structure

References 

Types of functions